Chettunnapdu is a village in Eluru district in the state of Andhra Pradesh in India.

Demographics

 India census, Chettunnapadu has a population of 2417 of which 1200 are males while 1217 are females. Average Sex Ratio is 1014. Child population is 256 which makes up 10.59% of total population of village with sex ratio 939. In 2011, literacy rate of the village was 74.32% when compared to 67.02% of Andhra Pradesh.

References 

Villages in Eluru district